"Big Blue Note" is a song co-written and recorded by American country music artist Toby Keith. It was released in September 2005 as the third and final single from Keith's album Honkytonk University.  It peaked at number 5 on the United States country charts. Prior to that single's release, DreamWorks Records closed its doors, so Keith had a newly-formed label, Show Dog Nashville. Keith wrote the song with Scotty Emerick.

Music video
The music video was directed by Michael Salomon, and premiered on CMT on September 12, 2005. It begins on a rainy day where a businessman had a good life, until his wife ran away with a "big blue note" on the floor. The video shows him having trouble getting rid of the note, but being unable to let go of her memory. Because of this, he is having trouble focusing at work, and an inkblot test at his psychiatrist shows up. Leading to him running a cliffside, he is actually taking the big blue note by folding into a paper airplane, and throws the big blue note off the cliff. The scene switches from a rainy day to a bright sunny day, as the businessman plays the banjo on the cliff.

Chart performance
"Big Blue Note" debuted at number 57 on the U.S. Billboard Hot Country Singles & Tracks for the week ending September 17, 2005.

References

2005 singles
2005 songs
Toby Keith songs
Songs written by Scotty Emerick
Songs written by Toby Keith
Song recordings produced by James Stroud
Show Dog-Universal Music singles
DreamWorks Records singles
Music videos directed by Michael Salomon